William Twemlow (1892 – 1 June 1933) was an English footballer who played in the English Football League for Port Vale and Stoke City. His brother Charlie was also a footballer.

Career

Stoke
Twemlow played for Audley and Sandbach Ramblers, before he joined Stoke in 1915. He played for Stoke during World War I, featuring once in 1915–16, six times in 1916–17, 37 times in 1917–18, and 26 times in 1918–19. Having been a first time regular during the war, once League football was resumed in 1919 he was first choice full-back under manager Arthur Shallcross. In 1919–20 he played 34 times, scoring twice both penalties against Bristol City in November and Bury in February. However, he lost his place to the veteran Tom Brittleton and only played three matches in 1920–21 and was released from his contract at the Victoria Ground at the end of the campaign.

Later career
He remained in the Second Division, as he joined local rivals Port Vale in August 1921. He was a regular in his debut season at The Old Recreation Ground, but picked up a cartilage injury in 1922 and was sidelined. After an operation to fix it he was only selected a further four times before he was released at the end of the 1922–23 season. He moved on to Macclesfield, where he played alongside his brother, and then Oswestry Town.

Career statistics
Source:

References

Sportspeople from Hanley, Staffordshire
English footballers
Association football fullbacks
Stoke City F.C. players
Port Vale F.C. players
Macclesfield Town F.C. players
Oswestry Town F.C. players
English Football League players
1892 births
1933 deaths